"Ngud'" is a song from South African rapper Kwesta's third studio album DaKAR II (2016). The song features a guest appearance from  Cassper Nyovest. The song was produced by DJ Maphorisa and samples Joakim's remix of  "Camino Del Sol" by Antena. It debuted at number 1 on iTunes and also debuted at number 7 on the EMA Local Top 10 chart. It peaked at number 1, making it Kwesta's first number one on the chart. It was certified 5× platinum by RISA. As of June 2016, the song had spent 14 non-consecutive weeks at 1 and was the most playlisted song on South African radio in 2016.

Charts

Accolades
The single "Ngud'" was nominated at annual  MTV Africa Awards in the song of the Year. 

|-
|2016
|"Ngud"
| Song of the Year 
|

References

Song recordings produced by DJ Maphorisa
South African Airplay Chart number-one singles
2016 singles
Hip hop songs
2016 songs
Kwesta songs